Wanborough railway station is in Flexford, Surrey, England. It serves the villages of Normandy to the north and Wanborough to the south.

South Western Railway operates the station and most of the trains that serve it. Great Western Railway also provides a limited service.

Services

History
The London and South Western Railway opened the station on its Guildford to Aldershot line in 1891. British Railways closed the station's signal box in 1966, on the day that it commissioned the then-new signal box at Ash Crossing. Ash Crossing signal box has itself since been decommissioned and demolished. BR made Wanborough unstaffed in 1987.

Much of Wanborough's train service has been remarkably unchanged over the years. A look at the historical website below shows for example:

Wanborough (from Guildford) to Ascot service Mon-Fri after the morning rush hour in the following years:

Year 1937: Times - Difficult to confirm all as times shown from Waterloo but basically at 0934, 1005 then at :35 and :05 till 2205 and then some later trains

Year 1939: Times 0937, 1007, 1039, 1109, 1137, 1237 and half-hourly to 0007 (next morning)

Year 1957: Times 0937, 1007, 1039, 1109, 1137, 1237, 1307, 1309, 1407, 1439, 1507, 1537, 1609, 1637, 1709, 1739, 1809, 1840, 1907, 1937, 2010, 2037, 2109, 2207, 2237,2307 (last service one hour earlier than in 1939)

Year 2010: Times 0936 and half-hourly till 2306

References

External links

 Wanborough Station, local history site

Railway stations in Surrey
Former London and South Western Railway stations
Railway stations in Great Britain opened in 1891
Railway stations served by Great Western Railway
Railway stations served by South Western Railway